Visharad Phirangi Prasad is an Indian politician. He was the member of 6th Lok Sabha as member Bansgaon. He was detained under D.I.R. and M.I.S.A. in 1975 during Emergency. He was elected as Member  Uttar Pradesh Legislative Assembly for two terms 1969 and 1974.

References

1940 births
Year of death missing
India MPs 1977–1979
Janata Party politicians
Indian National Congress politicians
Bharatiya Lok Dal politicians
People from Gorakhpur
Lok Sabha members from Uttar Pradesh
Uttar Pradesh MLAs 1969–1974
Uttar Pradesh MLAs 1974–1977